Trigonistis is a genus of moths of the family Erebidae. The genus was erected by Edward Meyrick in 1902.

Species
Trigonistis andersoni Holloway, 1977 Norfolk Island
Trigonistis anticlina (Meyrick, 1901) New Zealand
Trigonistis demonias Meyrick, 1902 Queensland
Trigonistis toroensis Holloway, 1977 New Caledonia

References

 Meyrick (1902). Transactions of the Entomological Society of London. 35: 39.

Hypeninae